Guido della Torre (27 September 1259 – summer 1312) was a Lord of Milan between 1302 and 1312.

Biography 
He was the son of  Francesco della Torre (brother of Napoleone della Torre) and Giulia Castiglioni,

As part of the factional turmoil between the Guelphs and Ghibellines, the conflict of Guido’s Guelph family with the Ghibelline Visconti, led by Ottone Visconti, dominated much of his childhood. In 1277, after the Battle of Desio, in which he lost his father, he was taken prisoner with his uncle Napoleone, and imprisoned in the castle of Baradello at Como. He escaped from this castle in 1284, with the help of Loterio Rusca, the Lord of Como and William VII, Marquess of Montferrat. He fled with his uncle Raimondo della Torre, who was the Patriarch of Aquileia. In 1287 Guido became Podestà of Treviso.

After his escape from the castle Baradello, Guido led the Guelphs in the riots that took place in Milan in the last years of the thirteenth century. In 1302, a group of Guelphs, including the Lords of Piacenza and Parma, Alberto Scotti and Ghiberto da Correggio, compelled the Visconti to leave Milan. After twenty-five years of exile, Guido della Torre and his family regained their power in Milan.

Guido then sought to forge new alliances through marriages:  Guido married the daughter of Count Filippo Langosco; his eldest son, Francesco, married a niece of Alberto Scotti; finally, his second son, Simone, married a daughter of Pietro Visconti.

Being the head of the della Torre family helped Guido in his election to Milan’s Captain of the People in 1307.  The following year Milan elected him as a perpetual capitano del popolo. However, in 1311 Guido entered in conflict with his cousin Cassone della Torre, archbishop of Milan: after an unsuccessful revolt against king Henry VII, he was forced to flee, first to Lodi, then to Cremona where Guido died in the summer of 1312.

References

External links 

Guido
1259 births
1312 deaths
13th-century Italian nobility
14th-century Italian nobility
Rulers of Milan
Date of death unknown